Coker may refer to:

People
 Coker (surname), including a list of people

Places

 Inhabited places
 Coker, Alabama, a town in Tuscaloosa County, Alabama, United States
 Coker, Texas, a community located in Bexar County, Texas, United States, located within the city limits of San Antonio
 Coker Creek, Tennessee, an unincorporated community in Monroe County, Tennessee, United States
 East Coker, a village and civil parish in Somerset, England
 East Coker (poem), one of the Four Quartets by T. S. Eliot, inspired by the village

 Other locations
 Coker College, a private American college based in Hartsville, South Carolina, United States
 Camp Coker, a Boy Scout Camp located in South Carolina, United States

Other uses
 Coker Tire, a specialty tire manufacturer
 Coker unit, an oil refinery processing unit
 Coker v. Georgia, a United States Supreme Court case striking down the death sentence of a defendant convicted of rape
 Cokernel, also referred to as the coker, a concept in mathematics

See also
 Cocker (disambiguation)
 Coke (disambiguation)
 Cooker